Fort Saratoga was one of seven temporary earthwork forts part of the Civil War Defenses of Washington, D.C., during the Civil War built in the Northeast quadrant of the city at the beginning of the Civil War by the Union Army to protect the city from the Confederate Army. From west to east, the forts were as follow: Fort Slocum, Fort Totten, Fort Slemmer, Fort Bunker Hill, Fort Saratoga, Fort Thayer and Fort Lincoln.. Unlike other forts, nothing remains of the structure.

Civil War
Fort Saratoga was an earthwork fort part of the Civil War Defenses of Washington, D.C. It was located 2 1/2 miles from the city at time, between Fort Bunker Hill and Fort Thayer on the north side of Brentwood Road (now Rhode Island Avenue (Washington, D.C.)), east of it crossing Queen's Chapel Road. It was established in August 1861 and built in part by the 112th Pennsylvania. The fort was 186 feet above mean tide level.

It had room for eight guns with a perimeter of 154 yards. The fort had the following armament:
 Six 32-pounder smoothbore canon (barbette)
 One 42-pounder James gun
 One 24-pounder Coehorn mortar

South of the fort, on the opposite side of the road was Battery Morris.

The following troops were garrison at the fort at some point during the Civil War:
 112th Regiment Pennsylvania - 2nd Heavy Artillery
 1st District of Columbia Infantry Regiment
 12th Veteran Reserve Regiment
 150th Ohio National Guard
 2nd Company, New Hampshhire Heavy Artillery

Post Civil War
With the end of the Civil War, the fort is abandoned in 1865.

The field went back to private ownership and in 1902, it is owned by a Mrs. Walsh and used as a cultivated field. Today, it is a residential with no sign of the fort.

See also
 Civil War Defenses of Washington
 Washington, D.C., in the American Civil War
 Fort Slocum
 Fort Totten
 Fort Slemmer
 Fort Bunker Hill
 Fort Thayer
 Fort Lincoln
 Battle of Fort Stevens

References

Bunker Hill, Fort
Bunker Hill, Fort
Bunker Hill
Bunker
American Civil War on the National Register of Historic Places
Parks in Washington, D.C.
Demolished buildings and structures in Washington, D.C.
Washington, D.C., in the American Civil War